Princess Alia Governmental Hospital or Hebron Governmental Hospital is a government hospital in the Hebron city, West Bank, Palestine. It is managed by the Palestinian Ministry of Health. It was built in 1957 and has 237 beds. It employs 596 staff, including a doctor, nurse, pharmacist, physiotherapist, laboratory technician, radiologist and others.

Asher Gross terror attack 
On July 7th, 1983, Asher Gross, an armed 18 year old American-Israeli student at the Israeli settler Yeshiva Shavei-Hevron , was stabbed in the stomach multiple times by a team of 3 men and 2 lookouts, near the town market after missing his ride. His Uzi submachine gun was taken, but Gross' friends who saw the attack, began a chase after the hit squad's car. Nearby Israeli soldiers were warned to stay in their positions, and could not respond. A local Arab, mistaking Gross for someone familiar, took him to the Princess Alia hospital. Upon recognizing that he was Jewish, seeing his Tzitzit strings, they refused to accept him and he died. There was a failed attempt to get rid of the body. Gross Square in Hebron where the stabbing occurred is named after him.

References 

 

Hospitals in the State of Palestine
Hospitals established in 1957